Rays Crossing is an unincorporated community in Union Township, Shelby County, in the U.S. state of Indiana.

History
Rays Crossing had its start as a depot and shipping point on the railroad. The community has the name of the Ray family of settlers. A post office was established at Rays Crossing in 1870, and remained in operation until it was discontinued in 1943.

Geography

References

Unincorporated communities in Shelby County, Indiana
Unincorporated communities in Indiana